Mount Abel is a mountain on Vancouver Island, British Columbia, Canada, located  east of Woss and  north of Sutton Peak.

See also
List of mountains in Canada

References

Abel, Mount
One-thousanders of British Columbia
Rupert Land District